The 1981 Giro del Trentino was the fifth edition of the Tour of the Alps cycle race and was held on 5 May to 7 May 1981. The race started and finished in Arco. The race was won by Roberto Visentini.

General classification

References

1981
1981 in road cycling
1981 in Italian sport